Archips fraterna is a moth of the family Tortricidae. It is found in Pakistan, Java and northern Borneo.

The larvae have been recorded feeding on Glycine max and Coffea librica.

References

Moths described in 1990
Archips
Moths of Asia